The Williams School is a private co-educational secondary school in New London, Connecticut, that offers classes from 6th grade to 12th grade. It was founded as the Williams Memorial Institute (WMI) by Harriet Peck Williams in 1891, following the death of her son Thomas W. Williams II, a well-known whaling merchant.

The school was originally located at 110 Broad Street in New London, but moved when it merged with Connecticut College in 1954.  Despite the merger, it remains a legally separate entity.  The original building became a Connecticut state courthouse in 1972, and was purchased by the state in 1997.

History

Location and facilities 

The school's first building was located at 110 Broad Street between Hempstead and Williams Streets. It was built in 1889-91 and was designed by Shepley, Rutan & Coolidge – the successor firm to H. H. Richardson – in the Richardsonian Romanesque style, which is featured in several other buildings in New London. The school was able to accommodate three hundred students and had seven classrooms, a gymnasium, laboratories, and a library. The WMI building was listed on the National Register of Historic Places in 1978 for its architecture, and since 1972 has housed the State of Connecticut Superior Court for Geographical Area 10.  The state bought the building in 1997.

First president 

Colin Sherman Buell was the first president of The Williams Memorial Institute. He was a key figure in improving higher education for women. Buell tried to expand the Memorial Institute to become a women's college, but the plan fell through due to lack of interest. When Wesleyan College in Middletown decided to stop admitting women to the university, Buell combined efforts with Elizabeth Wright. With  $135,000 from the City of New London $1 million from Morton F. Plant. they helped found Connecticut College. He later became a member of the college's board of trustees.

High school for girls
WMI was the high school for girls for New London and several of the towns surrounding it until 1951, when New London High School) opened.

Merger with Connecticut College

Agreement 

On February 18, 1954, the Williams Memorial Institute started discussions to relocate the school near the Connecticut College campus on Mohegan Avenue. The relocation cost $200,000 and stipulated that the college approve all the terms of the junction. The terms of the agreement were bonded by a ten-year contract, set to be renewed every five years after the completion of the initial ten years.

Location 

The current Williams School building is located in the south portion of the Connecticut College near Palmer Auditorium. The architects responsible for the design are Shreve, Lamb, and Harmon, who designed buildings for Connecticut College  The building was expanded on November 24, 1964, to be able to accommodate more students. Although the school changed its name to The Williams School, its legal name remains The Williams Memorial Institute.

Structure
Williams added a middle school (grades 7 and 8) in 1955, and became co-educational in 1971.

Connecticut College 

Through the relationship between the two schools, Connecticut College education majors are able to student teach at the Williams School, while the college provides funding to the Williams School. This relationship was one of the first ones between a college and a secondary or elementary school. The college and the school are separate entities that mutually benefit each other. The college has no power over educational curriculum and extracurricular activities of the school.

Associations 

 Accredited by the New England Association of Schools and Colleges (NEASC)
 Member of the National Association of Independent Schools (NAIS)
 Member of the Connecticut Association of Independent Schools (CAIS)
 Member of the Eastern Connecticut Chamber of Commerce and the Greater Mystic Chamber of Commerce

Presidents 
 1891–1938: Colin Sherman Buell
 1938–1946: Jerome Burett
 1946–1956: Gertrude Moon
 1950–1960: Evelyn Page
 1960–1963: Catherine Oakes
 1963–1978: Marion H. Hamilton
 1978–1994: Steven J. Dandenberg
 1994–1998: Lawrence Roberts
 1998–2008: Charlotte L. Rhea
 2008–present: Mark Fader

Notable alumni 

Valerie Azlynn - actress
Noah Bean - actor
Alzada Comstock - professor of economics at Mount Holyoke College
Susan DiBona - film composer
Grace L. Drake - Ohio state legislator
Jesse Metcalfe - actor
Ann Haven Morgan - professor of biology at Mount Holyoke College
Clancy Philbrick - artist
Stephen Trask - composer
Cassie Ventura - model and singer

References

External links

Schools in New London County, Connecticut
National Register of Historic Places in New London County, Connecticut